Holy Cross Lithuanian Roman Catholic Church is a historic church in Dayton, Ohio.  Built in 1914 by Lithuanian immigrants, the church has been a fixture in the community since then.  The church has ornate Lithuanian folk art stained glass windows depicting religious symbolism and the life of Jesus Christ.

An annual, popular fundraiser is the turtle soup and kugelis sale each November.  Though turtle soup is not a traditional Lithuanian dish, it was made popular by the Old North Dayton Lithuanian community during World War II when other meats were scarce.

Designed by Jonas Mulokas, it was built in 1965 and added to the National Register of Historic Places in 1991.

See also
 National Register of Historic Places listings in Dayton, Ohio

References

External links
Official church website

Lithuanian-American history
Churches on the National Register of Historic Places in Ohio
Roman Catholic churches completed in 1914
Roman Catholic churches in Dayton, Ohio
Lithuanian-American culture in Ohio
National Register of Historic Places in Montgomery County, Ohio
20th-century Roman Catholic church buildings in the United States